Tiquilia galapagoa is a species of plant in the family Boraginaceae. It is endemic to the Galápagos Islands.

References

Flora of Ecuador
galapagoa
Least concern plants
Taxonomy articles created by Polbot